The stalk-eyed mud crab, Macrophthalmus hirtipes, is a marine large-eyed crab of the family Macrophthalmidae, endemic to New Zealand including Campbell Island. It grows to around  shell width. It is either the only species in the subgenus Hemiplax and the most basal species in the genus Macrophthalmus, or the only species in the sister genus Hemiplax.

References

Ocypodoidea
Marine crustaceans of New Zealand
Crustaceans described in 1846
Taxa named by Honoré Jacquinot